The Mount Beulah Hotel, also known as the Jarrett Springs Hotel and known for the last 70 years as The Jarrett House, is an historic hotel located near the intersection of US Highways 23 and 441 in Dillsboro, Jackson County, North Carolina. It was built about 1884, and is three-story frame hotel with a triple-tiered porch. It combines traditional and modest Victorian decorative elements. The building has had a number of additions and modifications since its construction.

In 1984 it was added to the National Register of Historic Places.

Current use

The buildings and lot are being auctioned for back taxes on September 22, 2020, Jackson cty courthouse 2pm
The building is the dominant building of downtown Dillsboro, North Carolina, and still serves as a hotel and restaurant.  It was renovated in 1975, removing the original wooden Victorian porch and replacing it with a cast iron New Orleans-Style Porch and has had many minor cosmetic upgrades over the years.  It is one of the few remaining grand Southern Railway (U.S.) Resort Hotels.

See also
National Register of Historic Places listings in Jackson County, North Carolina

Gallery

References

Hotel buildings on the National Register of Historic Places in North Carolina
Victorian architecture in North Carolina
Hotel buildings completed in 1884
Buildings and structures in Jackson County, North Carolina
Railway hotels in the United States
Southern Railway (U.S.)
Hotels in North Carolina
National Register of Historic Places in Jackson County, North Carolina